.gh is the country code top-level domain (ccTLD) for Ghana.

Second level domains

 .com.gh - for companies
 .edu.gh - for schools
 .gov.gh - for government

There are some exceptions to these domains: parliament.gh for the Parliament of Ghana, isoc.gh for the ISOC Ghana Chapter, nic.gh for the Ghana Network Information Center, cocobod.gh for the Ghana Cocoa Board, techgov.gh for Techgov and yellowpages.gh for the Yellow Pages Ghana Directory.

References

External links
IANA .gh whois information
.gh domain registration website

Country code top-level domains
Communications in Ghana
Computer-related introductions in 1995

sv:Toppdomän#G